Daniele James Collinge (born 9 April 1998) is an English professional footballer who plays as a defender for  club Barnet.

Club career
Collinge began his youth career with Milton Keynes Dons in 2009. He progressed through the youth ranks and was on the bench for the first team on three occasions in March 2014 as a 15 year old. That summer, he joined VfB Stuttgart where he began playing for the under-17s. Collinge later progressed onto the under-19s and then onto the VfB Stuttgart II side playing in the Regionalliga Südwest. In June 2018, Collinge was one of 100 nominees for the Golden Boy award. However, he struggled with injuries that season, and made no appearances in the first half of the following season before leaving Stuttgart by mutual consent in January 2019.

In June 2019, Collinge signed for Colchester United on a two-year deal. He was restricted to under-23 games during his time with the Us, though he did play first-team football out on loan at Isthmian League clubs Maldon & Tiptree and A.F.C. Sudbury. He left Colchester by mutual consent in February 2021.

Collinge returned to MK Dons for pre-season training in July 2021, before signing for Dover Athletic at the end of the month after a successful trial. After 40 appearances in the 2021-22 season, Collinge was offered a new deal by the Whites following their relegation but rejected this to remain in the National League when he signed for Barnet in June 2022.

International career
Collinge was capped by England at under-16, under-17 and under-18 levels. With the under-17s, he played at the 2015 UEFA European Under-17 Championship and was part of the squad for the 2015 FIFA U-17 World Cup, although did not play.

Career statistics

References 

1998 births
Living people
People from Haywards Heath
Association football defenders
English footballers
England youth international footballers
English people of Italian descent
Milton Keynes Dons F.C. players
VfB Stuttgart II players
Colchester United F.C. players
Maldon & Tiptree F.C. players
A.F.C. Sudbury players
Dover Athletic F.C. players
Barnet F.C. players
Regionalliga players
Isthmian League players
National League (English football) players
English expatriate footballers
English expatriate sportspeople in Germany
Expatriate footballers in Germany